Marc García Antonell (born 7 March 1996) is a Spanish professional basketball player for Fuenlabrada of the Liga ACB. He is considered one of the most promising young Spanish players of his generation.

Professional career
García came through the youth ranks of Bàsquet Manresa, before transferring to FC Barcelona B, where he spent his first senior season (2012–13). In the summer of 2014, he returned to Manresa on a loan deal, making his first steps in Spain's elite league ACB during the 2014-15 campaign. After one year with Manresa's men's squad, he headed back to Barca B, leading the team in scoring (16.2ppg) in the 2015-16 LEB Oro season.

In July 2016, García was sent to ACB outfit CB Sevilla on a two-year loan deal. However, after the relegation of the Andalusian team, Barcelona terminated the loan.

On 20 July 2018 García signed a three-year deal with Montakit Fuenlabrada of the Liga ACB.

On 23 July 2021 he signed with San Pablo Burgos of the Spanish Liga ACB.

On 13 August 2022 he signed with Río Breogán of the Liga ACB.

On 15 October 2022 he signed with Fuenlabrada of the Liga ACB for a second stint.

International career
García has competed on the Spain national under-18 basketball team at the junior levels, winning the bronze team medal at the 2013 FIBA Europe Under-18 Championship in Latvia.

Awards and accomplishments

Club honours
 Ciutat de L'Hospitalet Tournament: All-Tournament Team, MVP (2013-2014)
 Nike International Junior Tournament: All-Tournament Team (2012-2013)

Spain national team
Junior national team 
 2013 FIBA Europe Under-18 Championship: 
Youth national team 
 2016 FIBA Europe Under-20 Championship:

References

External links
Profile at ACB.com
FIBA Profile

1996 births
Living people
Baloncesto Fuenlabrada players
Bàsquet Manresa players
Basketball players from Catalonia
CB Miraflores players
FC Barcelona Bàsquet B players
Liga ACB players
Sportspeople from Manresa
Real Betis Baloncesto players
Shooting guards
Spanish men's basketball players